Alan Ciner (born May 14, 1947) is an American guitarist best known for playing guitar for The American Breed from 1966 to 1969.

Career 
He was also the guitarist for Gary & the Knight Lites.  He briefly played for Rufus and is heard on one of the band's best-known hits, "Tell Me Something Good". He later replaced James "Smitty" Smith (who had in turn replaced Michael Allsup) in Three Dog Night in 1975; and remained with them until they initially disbanded in 1976.

In the late 1970s, he played on three songs, "Trying to Get to You", "Give Me One More Chance" and "I’m Carrying" which eventually surfaced on the From the Heart & Soul album by Dianne Brooks which was released by the Panda Digital label in 2021.

References 

1947 births
Living people
American rock guitarists
American male guitarists
Three Dog Night members
Rufus (band) members
The American Breed members
Guitarists from Chicago
20th-century American guitarists
20th-century American male musicians